The rivière du Grand Portage (English: Grand Portage River) is a tributary of Chigoubiche River, flowing into the unorganized territory of Lac-Ashuapmushuan in the Le Domaine-du-Roy Regional County Municipality, in the administrative region of Saguenay–Lac-Saint-Jean, in province of Quebec, in Canada.

The valley of the Grand Portage river is mainly served by the forest road R0204 which goes up all this valley and connects towards the south to the road R0406. The route R0204 connect north to route 167.

Forestry (mainly forestry) is the main economic activity in this valley; secondly, recreational tourism activities, mainly because of the Ashuapmushuan Wildlife Reserve.

Geography 
The Grand Portage River draws its source from an unidentified lake.

This spring is located in a mountainous area in the unorganized territory of Lac-Ashuapmushuan, at:
  east of forest road R024;
  south-east of the mouth of the Grand Portage river;
  south of the old Frigon station of the Canadian National railway;
  southwest of the course of the Ashuapmushuan River.

Upper course of the Grand Portage river ( segment)

  towards the west, in particular by crossing a first lake, then a second lake, by cutting forest road R024 (north–south direction), to the end of a bay on the west shore of Lac Meilleur; then north-west, crossing Meilleur Lake, to its mouth;
  first to the north-west along the foot of the mountains, forming several small irregular coils, crossing Poodle lake at the start of the segment, by collecting the discharge (coming from the southwest) of a lake, the discharge of Lake Élieudes (coming from the north), the discharge (coming from the southwest) of Lake Bélus and the discharge (coming from northeast) of lac Sagelat, to the south shore of lac Lancelot;
  north (oriented slightly east) in a deep valley, crossing Lancelot lake, by collecting the discharge (coming from the east) of Lake Égérie, the discharge of lakes Poupas and Hécate, the discharge of Lake Fouju, the discharge of a set of lakes including Lac des Grèbes, up to the confluence of a stream (coming from the northeast). Note: Lake Lancelot receives on the west side the discharge of Lake Altair and the discharge (coming from the north) of Lake Joussé;
  towards the north-east, collecting the discharge (coming from the north-west) of a set of lakes in particular Quirouet, Gaudet, Guélard and Dalou, up to a corresponding river bend at the outlet (coming from the north-west) of Lac des Anophèles;
  eastward crossing some rapids, forming a small loop northward, to the confluence of the Grand Portage South-West River (coming from the south);

Lower course of the Grand Portage river ( segment)

  to the northeast, forming a large curve to the northwest to go around a mountain with steep cliffs (southeast side of the river), forming a hook to the 'east, by collecting the discharge (coming from the south-east) of the lake of Chaland, by collecting the discharge (coming from the west) of the lake Laramée, and curving towards the east to circumvent a mountain, until the confluence of the Grand Portage South-East River (coming from the south);
  northward in a sometimes steep-sided valley, forming a few large irregular coils in the middle of the segment where it crosses areas of marshes, and cutting the route 167 at the end of the segment, up to its mouth.

The Grand Portage river empties on the southwest bank of the Chigoubiche River, opposite the railway. This confluence is located at:
  east of Chigoubiche Lake;
  south-west of the mouth of the Chigoubiche River;
  northwest of downtown Saint-Félicien.

Toponymy 
The toponym "rivière du Grand Portage" was made official on December 5, 1968, at the Place Names Bank of the Commission de toponymie du Québec.

See also 

 List of rivers of Quebec

References 

Rivers of Saguenay–Lac-Saint-Jean
Le Domaine-du-Roy Regional County Municipality